This is a list of University of Oxford people in the Law.  Many were students at one (or more) of the colleges of the University, and others held fellowships at a college.

This list forms part of a series of lists of people associated with the University of Oxford – for other lists, please see the main article List of University of Oxford people.

Oxford has produced a large number of distinguished jurists, judges and lawyers around the world. This list includes twelve Lord Chancellors, ten Lord Chief Justices, nine UK Supreme Court Justices  and twenty-two law lords; four associate justices of the US Supreme Court as well as six puisne justices of the Supreme Court of Canada and a chief justice of the now defunct Federal Court of Canada. The current Lord Chief Justice (the most senior judge in England and Wales), Lord Burnett, was educated at Oxford.

European Court of Human Rights

Lord Chancellors and Lord Chief Justices

Justices of the Supreme Court of the United Kingdom

Lords of Appeal in Ordinary (Law Lords)

Other judges and lawyers: United Kingdom

Judges and lawyers: other countries

Academia 
See List of University of Oxford people in academic disciplines

The list of noted legal scholars includes H. L. A. Hart, Ronald Dworkin, A. V. Dicey, William Blackstone, John Gardner, Timothy Endicott, Peter Birks, John Finnis, Andrew Ashworth, Joseph Raz, Jeremy Waldron, Leslie Green, Tony Honoré, Neil MacCormick, Hugh Collins, John Eekelaar, Robert Stevens, Paul Craig, Ben McFarlane.

Other distinguished practitioners who have attended Oxford include Lord Pannick QC, Geoffrey Robertson QC, Amal Clooney, Lord Faulks QC, Dinah Rose QC, Ben Emmerson QC.

See also

A select list of former Rhodes Scholars
List of Vice-Chancellors of the University of Oxford
List of Current Heads of Oxford University Colleges, Societies, and Halls

References

External links
British Society for the History of Mathematics: Oxford individuals
Famous Oxford Alumni
Short Alumni List Published by Oxford

 Law
Oxford